This is a list of notable events in Latin music (i.e. Spanish- and Portuguese-speaking music from Latin America, Europe, and the United States) that took place in 2015.

Events
January 7 — The Nielsen Media Research releases the 2014 United States music report, showing that Latin music contributed 2.6% of total music sales. 
January 9 — PROMUSICAE introduces a new chart which combines streaming, downloads, and physical sales.
February 3 — Puerto Rican singer Ivy Queen releases four albums, something "that nobody in the industry ever did before," according to Fox News Latino.
February 19 — Spanish singer Enrique Iglesias and American singer-songwriter Romeo Santos became the most awarded performers on the 27th Lo Nuestro Awards with both earning six awards each. Guatemalan singer-songwriter Ricardo Arjona is awarded the Excellence Award while Italian singer Laura Pausini received an award for her musical trajectory.
April 30 — Romeo Santos is the biggest winner at the 2015 Billboard Latin Music Awards with a total of ten awards. Brazilian singer Roberto is given the Lifetime Achievement Award and Mexican-American musician Carlos Santana receives the Spirit of Hope.
May 13 — Sirope by Alejandro Sanz becomes the best-selling album in Spain on its release week since 2006.
August 28 — Donald Trump's comments about Mexican illegal immigrants result in a backlash from several Latin artists such as Ricky Martin, Marc Anthony, and Paulina Rubio.
September 1 — "El Perdón" by Nicky Jam and Enrique Iglesias surpasses "La Tortura" by Shakira and Alejandro Sanz as the second-longest number one song on the Billboard Hot Latin Songs chart.
September 9 — Puerto Rican singer Víctor Manuelle becomes the artist with the most number-one songs on the Billboard Tropical Songs chart with 26 songs.
September 11 — Abraham Quintanilla, Jr., father of Tejano singer Selena, released a previously unreleased song after 20 years of the singer's death.
September 15 — Sony Music announces its deal with Cuban record label EGREM to distribute recordings internationally which date back to the 1960s.
September 17 — Emilio Estefan, Myriam Hernandez, Gustavo Santaolalla, Alvaro Torres, Hector Ochoa Cardenas, and Diego Torres are inducted into the Latin Songwriters Hall of Fame.
September 24 — Mexican singer-songwriter Carla Morrison becomes the first female soloist in 22 weeks to enter the top 10 of Billboard Latin Digital Songs chart.
September 27
 Mexican singer and reality star Larry Hernandez is arrested in Ontario, Canada, on suspicion of kidnapping, assault and assault and battery causing injury.
 Colombian singer Shakira performed "Imagine" for Pope Francis at the United Nations.  In her role as a UNICEF Goodwill Ambassador, she also urged UNICEF to devote greater efforts toward early child development.
September 28 — Tejano singer Arnold Martinez sues Freddie Records for $3,000 of unpaid royalties in a Houston courtroom.
October 8The inaugural Latin American Music Awards are held at the Dolby Theatre in Los Angeles, California. Enrique Iglesias is the most awarded artist with five wins including Artist of the Year.
October 26 — Colombian singer J Balvin became the first artist to receive the Latin Digital Diamond  award from the Recording Industry Association of America denoting digital sales of 600,000 units for his songs "6 AM" and "Ay Vamos".
November 9 — After eight years since they separated, Noel Schajris and Leonel Garcia announced they will reunite as Sin Bandera and release one more album together.
November 18 — Roberto Carlos is honored by the Latin Academy of Recording Arts & Sciences as the Person of the Year.
November 19
16th Annual Latin Grammy Awards
"Hasta la Raíz" by Natalia Lafourcade wins Song of the Year and Record of the Year. 
Todo Tiene Su Hora performed by Juan Luis Guerra wins Album of the Year.
Monsieur Periné wins Best New Artist.
December 9 — Romeo Santos is named Top Latin Artist of the year by Billboard magazine.
December 12 — Reggaeton singer Yandel becomes the first Latin artist to live stream a concert on the music service Tidal.

Bands formed 
Cidade Dormitório (Brazil)
CNCO (Latin pop)
Ezetaerre (Spain)
Joana Marte (Brazil)

Bands disbanded

Number-ones albums and singles by country
List of Hot 100 number-one singles of 2015 (Brazil)
List of number-one songs of 2015 (Colombia)
List of number-one albums of 2015 (Mexico)
List of number-one albums of 2015 (Portugal)
List of number-one albums of 2015 (Spain)
List of number-one singles of 2015 (Spain)
List of number-one Billboard Latin Albums from the 2010s
List of number-one Billboard Hot Latin Songs of 2015
List of number-one singles of 2015 (Venezuela)

Awards
2015 Premio Lo Nuestro
2015 Billboard Latin Music Awards
2015 Latin American Music Awards
2015 Latin Grammy Awards
2015 Tejano Music Awards

Albums released

First quarter

January

February

March

Second quarter

April

May

June

Third quarter

July

August

September

Fourth quarter

October

November

December

Best-selling records

Best-selling albums
The following is a list of the top 10 best-selling Latin albums in the United States in 2015, according to Billboard.

Best-performing songs
The following is a list of the top 10 best-performing Latin songs in the United States in 2015, according to Billboard.

Deaths
January 20 – Canserbero, 26, Venezuelan rapper (suicide by jumping)
February 5 – Celina Gonzalez, 85, Cuban singer
February 12 – Sergio Blanco, 66, Spanish singer (Sergio y Estíbaliz).
February 25 – Ariel Camacho, 22, Mexican singer (traffic collision)
March 8 – Inezita Barroso, 90, Brazilian folk singer
March 30 – Aniceto Molina, 75, Colombian cumbia musician
June 14 – Hugo Blanco, 74, Venezuelan musician and composer ("Moliendo Café")
June 23 – Marujita Díaz, 83, Spanish singer and actress, complications from colon cancer.
June 24 – Cristiano Araújo, 29, Brazilian singer and songwriter (traffic collision)
July 12 – Javier Krahe, 71, Spanish singer-songwriter, heart attack.
July 13 – Joan Sebastian, 64, Mexican singer and songwriter, bone cancer.
August 5 – Raphy Leavitt, 66, Puerto Rican composer and orchestra leader, complications of surgery for artificial hip infection.
August 21 – Daniel Rabinovich, 71, Argentine musician and comedian (Les Luthiers).
September 7 – Guillermo Rubalcaba, 88, Cuban pianist, bandleader, composer and orchestrator
November 6 – José Ángel Espinoza, 96, Mexican singer, composer and actor.
December 1 – Leoni Franco, 73, Uruguayan musician, composer and guitarist.
December 19 – Selma Reis, 55, Brazilian actress and singer, brain cancer.
December 25 – Manuel Agujetas, 76, Spanish flamenco singer.

References

 
Latin music by year